Heist or Hit is a multi genre independent record label and music publisher located in London and Manchester, founded in 2007.

About
‘Tied to the tracks since 2008’, Heist or Hit are an independent record label based in Manchester, made up of Founder: Mick Scholefield, Label Manager: Martin Colclough, Sync / Social Media Manager: Pat Fogarty and most recent addition: A&R Assistant, Sam Coomber. The label’s line up boasts a notable array of artists, from past signings such as Sea Moya, Simian Ghost - and of course, the late dream-pop duo, Her’s - to their current roster, featuring the likes of Hobby Club, Brad Stank and many more. The label are without doubt a discernible influence within the UK’s music community - YUCK magazine

The current roster includes Eades, Pizzagirl, Brad Stank, SKIA, JWestern, Tungz, Hannah's Little Sister, Orpine, Guest Singer

In 2010 the label was selected as DIY Label of the Week by Huw Stephens on his BBC Radio 1 show 
In November 2011 the label was Bethan Elfyn's choice for her 'Label it Up’ feature on Amazing Radio.

Current artists
 Eades
 Brad Stank
 Pizzagirl
 SKIA
 Tungz
 JWestern
 Hannah's Little Sister
 Orpine
 Guest Singer

Former artists
 Her's
 Nature TV
 Hobby Club
 Honey Moon
 Dantevilles
 High Hazels
 Northern American
 Sea Moya
 Simian Ghost
 Still Parade
 The Answering Machine
 Bad Veins
 The Crookes
 Dinowalrus
 Fantasy Rainbow
 First Love, Last Rites
 I Am Oak
 Laurel Canyons
 Letting Up Despite Great Faults
 LoveLikeFire
 Pomegranates
 Rapids!
 Skint & Demoralised

See also
 List of record labels
 List of independent UK record labels

References

External links
 

British independent record labels
Alternative rock record labels